Erich Momberger (born 6 August 1968) is a Papua New Guinean athlete. He competed in the men's decathlon at the 1992 Summer Olympics.

References

External links
 

1968 births
Living people
Athletes (track and field) at the 1992 Summer Olympics
Papua New Guinean decathletes
Olympic athletes of Papua New Guinea
People from the National Capital District (Papua New Guinea)